Corey White (born May 9, 1990) is a former American football cornerback. He played college football for Samford University. He was drafted by the New Orleans Saints in the fifth round of the 2012 NFL Draft.

Early years
White was born in Dunwoody, Georgia and attended Dunwoody High School, before accepting a scholarship to play college football for Samford University.

As a senior, he caught the attention from professional scouts with his strong performances in Samford's occasional games against major college opponents and at the NFL Scouting Combine.

Professional career

New Orleans Saints
White was selected by the New Orleans Saints in the fifth round (162nd) of the 2012 NFL draft. White became the highest selection in Samford's school history until Jaquiski Tartt was drafted in the second round (46th overall) in the 2015 NFL Draft. On July 2, he signed a four-year contract. 

He was active in 10 games and started 4 of them in his rookie season, as he registered 31 tackles with 1 interception. The next year, he played in all of the games and started 6 due to injuries in the secondary, playing poorly at cornerback, while recording 41 tackles, 1 interception and 1 forced fumble.

In December 2014, White was moved from cornerback to free safety after Jairus Byrd and Rafael Bush were placed on the injured reserve list. He ended the season with 53 tackles, 2 interceptions and a forced fumble. On March 13, 2015, he was waived after starting 19 out of 41 games.

Dallas Cowboys
White was claimed by the Dallas Cowboys on March 14, 2015. He showed promise in preseason playing at safety and nickel corner. In the fifth game of the season against the New England Patriots, he passed Tyler Patmon and took over the team's nickel corner role, until the eighth game of the season against the Philadelphia Eagles, when he was declared inactive and replaced by Patmon. On November 17, he was released to make room for cornerback Deji Olatoye.

Arizona Cardinals
The Arizona Cardinals signed White on December 2, 2015. He played three games, not recording a tackle, and was declared inactive for the final two regular season contests.

Buffalo Bills
On April 4, 2016 White signed with the Buffalo Bills.

New York Jets
On May 25, 2017, White signed with the New York Jets. On August 4, 2017, White was placed on injured reserve. He was released with an injury settlement on August 10, 2017.

Indianapolis Colts
On August 21, 2017, White signed with the Indianapolis Colts. He was released on September 2, 2017.

Cleveland Browns
On January 11, 2018, White signed a reserve/future contract with the Cleveland Browns. He was released by the Browns on April 20, 2018.

References

External links
Arizona Cardinals bio

1990 births
Living people
People from Dunwoody, Georgia
Players of American football from Georgia (U.S. state)
Sportspeople from DeKalb County, Georgia
American football cornerbacks
American football safeties
Samford Bulldogs football players
New Orleans Saints players
Dallas Cowboys players
Arizona Cardinals players
Buffalo Bills players
New York Jets players
Indianapolis Colts players
Cleveland Browns players
Dunwoody High School alumni